Borland is an American software company.

Borland may also refer to:

Borland (surname), a Scottish surname
Borland Racing Developments, Australian racecar constructor
Borland Amendment, US law

Places 
Borland, Pleasants County, West Virginia, unincorporated community
Mount Borland, mountain in Antarctica
Lands of Borland, estate in Scotland

See also
Borland C (disambiguation)